Gandoman Industrial Estate ( – Qaṭab Şanʿatī-ye Gandomān) is a village and company town in Gandoman Rural District, Gandoman District, Borujen County, Chaharmahal and Bakhtiari Province, Iran. At the 2006 census, its population was 10, in 4 families.

References 

Populated places in Borujen County